Rudolf Doležal (19 July 1916 in Horka nad Moravou, – 2002 in Olomouc) was a Czech sculptor and medallist, author of many sculptures in Moravian towns and villages.

Works
 1947: Pěvci Slezských písní (Statue of Petr Bezruč), Olomouc - Bezruč Park - with Vojtěch Hořínek a Karel Lenhart
 1950: Výhybkář, Olomouc - Svoboda Avenue
 1951 - 1955: Statue of Lenin and Stalin, Olomouc - with Vojtěch Hořínek, removed in 1990
 1958: Muses, Summer cinema in Olomouc
 1959: Frývaldov Strike (statue), Dolní Lipová
 1960: Workers Family, Olomouc-New Street - Litovel Street
 1961: Boy with Pigeon, elementary school in Horka nad Moravou
 1966: Welder, Přerov
 1967: Children, Lipník nad Bečvou
 1970s: Statue Ječný klas ("ear of barley") in I. P. Pavlova Street, Olomouc
 1972: Readers,  Vsetín - elementary school
 1974: Airman, Olomouc - Peace Avenue
 1976: Novitas Olomucensis - the main road of the flowers fair Flora Olomouc
 1977: Spring Song, Vsetín - housing estate Trávníky
 1979: Klement Gottwald Statue,  Olomouc, removed in 1990

Gallery

References
 Dvořák, František: Rudolf Doležal, Ostrava 1985.
 Otava, Marek: Okolnosti výstavby sousoší Lenina a Stalina v Olomouci v letech 1949-1955, in: „Střední Morava - vlastivědná revue 24 (2007)“, s. 27-43.
 Pospíšil, Zdeněk: Rudolf Doležal - mezi plastikou a medailí, Olomouc 2001, .

1916 births
2002 deaths
People from Olomouc District
Czech medallists
Czech male sculptors
20th-century Czech sculptors
20th-century male artists
Czechoslovak artists